Pelham may refer to:

People
 Pelham (name), including a list of people with the name

Places

In Australia

 Pelham, Queensland, a locality in the Western Downs Region

In Canada

 Pelham, Ontario
 Pelham Range, on Vancouver Island, British Columbia

In the United Kingdom
 Pelham, Birmingham, a suburb in Birmingham
 Brent Pelham  a village in Hertfordshire, England, one of the three Pelham villages, along with the nearby Stocking Pelham and Furneux Pelham
 Pelham Arcade, Grade II* listed building in East Sussex

In the United States

In New York 
 Pelham, New York, a town in Westchester County
 Pelham (Metro-North station), a train station in the above town
 Pelham (village), New York, a village within the above town
 North Pelham, New York, former village within the above town, and now neighborhood within Village of Pelham
 Pelham Manor, New York, a village within the above town
 IRT Pelham Line, NYC subway line
 Pelham Bay (disambiguation)
 Pelham Gardens, Bronx, a neighborhood
 Pelham Parkway, Bronx, a neighborhood

Elsewhere 
 Pelham, Alabama
 Pelham, Georgia
 Pelham, Massachusetts
 Pelham, New Hampshire
 Pelham, North Carolina
 Pelham, Tennessee
 Pelham, Pietermaritzburg, South Africa

Arts, entertainment, and media
 Pelham (novel), an 1828 novel by Edward Bulwer-Lytton, 1st Baron Lytton
 The Taking of Pelham One Two Three (disambiguation), a novel by Morton Freedgood, and its three film adaptations

Other uses 
 Pelham, a type face in the Times New Roman family
 Pelham bit, a type of curb bit used while riding horses
 Pelham Puppets, an English toy-making company